Anime Matsuri is an annual four-day anime convention traditionally held during spring at the George R. Brown Convention Center in Houston, Texas. The convention's name comes from the Japanese word 'matsuri' meaning festival.

Programming
The convention's programming includes an artists' alley, a carshow, the attendance of celebrities and special guests, cosplay chess, cosplay contests, fashion shows, gaming events, karaoke, LARP, live concerts, maid cafe, panels, a vendors' and exhibitors' area, and workshops. The Charity Auction benefited Child's Play in 2009 and raised over $3,000.

History
The convention was held at George R. Brown Convention Center and Hilton Americas in 2007. Anime Matsuris 2008, 2009, 2010, and 2012 were held at the Woodlands Waterway Marriott Hotel and Convention Center, and Anime Matsuri 2011 was held at the Crowne Plaza Houston Hotel near Reliant Park/Medical Center. Anime Matsuri 2013 was held at Hyatt Regency Houston. The Syfy reality series Heroes of Cosplay filmed the masquerade at Anime Matsuri and was featured in an episode. The convention in 2014 moved to the George R. Brown Convention Center. Complaints about the 2014 convention included long lines and delays. The convention in 2015 remained at the George R. Brown Convention Center and used the first and most of the second floors. In May 2016, Anime Matsuri announced that the former CEO of Anime Expo, Marc Perez would join the convention as COO. Anime Matsuri 2020 was moved from July to August due to the COVID-19 pandemic, and was later canceled after Houston announced the city would be holding no more events in 2020.

Controversies
The owners of Anime Matsuri have a history of not paying their partners, like Houston native Mike Udompongsuk, who lent tens of thousand of dollars to Anime Matsuri over the years but never saw reimbursement, and financially burning its guests, like the record label PS Company, which represented the Japanese rock star Miyavi in 2009. Significant financial improprieties have also been alleged against the convention organizers. 

Voice actress Caitlin Glass attended Anime Matsuri 2014 as one of the guests, but refuses to have anything to do with the convention after due to poor organisation and treatment of the guests. Voice actor Matthew Mercer attended as a guest in 2008, and was told without warning to emcee for the opening ceremony. He left Anime Matsuri before the closing ceremony, which he was also presumed to emcee for, despite not being asked.

After Anime Matsuri 2015, John Leigh, the convention's founder was accused of sexual harassment by several members of the Lolita fashion community. These include accusations of unwanted touching, slapping buttocks, sexual jokes, requesting nude photos, lifting up clothing and asking a woman when she last had an orgasm. The convention sent Tyler Willis, owner of YouTube channel Last Week Lolita News a cease and desist letter in early 2018 after reporting about John Leigh's sexual harassment. Boycott Anime Matsuri was formed in 2018 to inform about the conventions past actions, with guests such as Johnny Yong Bosch, Steven Universe voice actors, and Femm later canceling. Leigh apologized for his past actions. 

Anime Matsuri 2018 saw one con attendant walk around the convention wearing a full nazi costume and attending the Terrible Fanfiction Panel, where he read fanfiction about Anne Frank and made jokes about the Holocaust.

In 2019, Houston mayor Sylvester Turner was part of the opening ceremony of Anime Matsuri where he said he expected there to be more than 40,000 attendants that year. Anime Matsuri reported an attendance number of 43,000 for that year, but these numbers have been disputed. Anime Matsuri has been accused of inflating the number of attendants in its yearly reports. Patrick Delahanty of AnimeCons.com has cited Anime Matsuri as the reason why they did not publish a list of the largest anime cons in the United States in 2019, as they did not want to reward Anime Matsuri for lying. Anime Matsuri has been retroactively removed from all of AnimeCons.com'''s previous reports on the largest anime cons of North America, citing the "significant discrepancies" between the numbers reported by the con, and the number of tickets sold according to the venue.

Mayor Turner returned to open the 2021 convention, but his appearance and support of the convention triggered controversy.

Event history

Anime Matsuri Hawaii
Anime Matsuri Hawaii (AMHI) was a three-day anime convention held during November at the Hawaii Convention Center in Honolulu, Hawaii. The convention's programming included a concert, cosplay showcase, J-Fashion show, screenings, and panels. Yuegene Fay, a Thai cosplayer, was unable to make a guest appearance due to immigration issues. Upon arrival in Honolulu she was detained and put in a holding cell for three days. Anime Matsuri Hawaii did not return in 2016.

Event history

Anime licensor
In July 2022, Anime Matsuri announced they had licensed two shorts from Nippon Animation, Genbanojō and Chuck Shimezō''. Both were dubbed and Vic Mignogna was controversially involved in the production.

References

External links

Anime conventions in the United States
Recurring events established in 2007
2007 establishments in Texas
Annual events in Texas
Conventions in Houston
Japanese-American culture in Texas
Festivals in Houston
Tourist attractions in Houston
Anime companies
Dubbing (filmmaking)
Mass media companies established in 2022